Margaret Maiki Souza Aiu Lake (28 May 1925 – 19 June 1984) was a hula dancer, kumu hula, hula teacher, and influential figure in the second Hawaiian Renaissance because of her revolutionary teaching techniques. Because of her work she was recognized as the "Mother of Hawaiian Renaissance." Many of her students became teachers themselves making her the "most important hula teacher of the 20th century."

Early life 
Margaret Ma’iki Souza was born in Honolulu, Hawai'i on May 28, 1925. Though her parents were Peter Charles Souza and Cecilia Pai’ohe Gilman Souza, she was first adopted and living with her great aunt, Cecilia Rose Mahoe, and husband John William Kealoha in the Palolo Valley. As hānai, (Hawaiian term for informal adoption) Ma’iki considered them to be her grandparents. After the passing of her adoptive family, she briefly returned to live with her biological mother, Cecilia Pai’ohe (who she is now buried with). Shortly after, she went to go live with her other great aunt, Helen Pamaieulu Ha’o Correa who sparked her inspiration in hula.

Margaret Ma’iki Souza Aiu started to learn the hula dance between the ages of 14-15. Though her great aunt Helen was her original mentor in hula, Ma’iki would later go on to professionally study under Lōkālia Montgomery and officially graduate as an ʻōlapa (dancer) in 1964 at the age of 18. Lōkālia Montgomery was known as a “master of ancient hula.” Lōkālia had a very traditional way of teaching hula. Her teaching style was described as stern yet breathtaking.

While continuing to study hula, Aiu simultaneously worked as a professional contemporary/modern hula dancer at the Club Pago Pago and La Hula Rhumba in Waikiki for the next 8 years. Aiu would continue to seek mentorship from masters of hula and cultural research while working, such as Hawaiian scholar and Kumu Hula Mary Kawena Puku'i, noted ancient hula dancer 'Iolani Luahine, Vicki 'Ii Rodrigues, Bina Mossman and Kumu Hula Pua Ha'aheo regarding male hula styles. Ma'iki is noted for bringing back men dancers in hula, as they were in ancient times, the forefront performers in festivals and religious rituals.  For Ma’iki, learning hula was not only about the choreography, but the culture, rich history, and deep meaning of it as well. So as a Christian it was difficult for Ma’iki to comfortably study the art of hula and its goddess, Laka, but with the help of her tutu (grandmother), she overcame the conflict.

Career 
Though Lake was studying to become a nurse through heavy influence from friends and family she was convinced to pursue her dream to become a Kumu Hula (dance master). She first started her career as a hula teacher by teaching to the Hawaiian Society at Blessed Sacrament Church where they occasionally put on performances. Teaching at the church did not satisfy Ma’iki so she opened a dance studio of her own called Margaret Aiu’s Hula Studio. After gaining approval from her teachers, in 1952 she changed the name of the studio to Hālau Hula O Ma’iki. Lake’s school was the first of the 20th century to be able to be claimed as a hālau. On the islands, there is a very big distinction between a normal hula studio that can be found on any part of the mainland and a Hālau Hula. Normal hula studios teach the traditional Polynesian dance forms like hula, Tahitian, Maori, or Samoan dance. Students at a hula studio are taught by staff members, not the actual Kumu Hula (master). Sometimes if there are advanced enough students, they can be taught by the Kumu Hula in a separate class. In a Hālau Hula though, it is organized so information from the Kumu Hula is directly given to the students. Students of the Hālau Hula are expected to pass down this information that they are given from a specific lineage of Kumu Hula to the next generation.

In 1972, Ma’iki advertised for a public Kumu Hula class. This was the first time that a class like that had been offered publicly. Many people were critical of Lake’s decision at first until it became noticeable that a substantial number of students interested were extremely skilled and devoted to hula. Some of the students who graduated from Ma’iki Aiu Lake’s Hālau ended up becoming some of the most well-known hula teachers/performers. Some of her students included Mapuana De Silva, Leina'ala Kalama Heine, and Robert Cazimero (one of the first men who participated in the reintroduction of male hula dancers in the Merrie Monarch Festival in the 1970s)  of The Brothers Cazimero.

At the time traditional hula was becoming a dying practice but because of Lake’s modern teaching style, there was a new generation infatuated with it and a huge demand from the tourist industry. As part of her revolutionary movement in the Hawaiian Renaissance, Lake would accept any students who were interested in learning the hula no matter their background or gender so they could “experience the art of Hawaiian dance, expressing all that we see, hear, smell touch taste and feel.” Because of this, it sparked questions during the Hawaiian Renaissance as to why men were not present in hula before. She was able to reconcile the traditional and modern aspects of hula. Whilst doing this she was able to bring back the love and appreciation for the dance in younger generations.

Ma’iki Aiu Lake taught people of all ages and skill levels, from young to old or beginner to advanced.  At Hālau Hula O Ma’iki, her students learned not only the dance but the traditional genealogies, mannerisms, legends, poetry, and culture of Hawaii. As part of Lake’s new techniques, she created new pedagogical systems for her students. One new technique she utilized was requiring her students to keep notebooks filled with the chants and dances they learned to help with memorization. To keep the ancient traditions of hula alive, Lake would teach them how to responsibly gather materials to make their own leis, mats, and costumes. Lake would train her students in a variety of dances like kahiko (dance traditionally performed as a ceremony with chants and percussion instruments) and ‘auana  (a less formal form of hula, where a ceremony is not needed). Though Ma’iki could be a tough teacher like Lōkālia according to her students, she was also seen as a mother figure to them.

Family and legacy 
Ma’iki was married to Honolulu Fire Chief Boniface K. Aiu on February 21, 1947. The couple raised seven children together, with the two eldest from her previous marriage. Ma’iki divorced and remarried to her final husband, a Hawaiian performer named Haywood Kahauanu Lake. He was a singer and songwriter who Ma’iki and her many students of Halau Hula 'O Ma'iki often performed with before her passing. Two of her known daughters, Karen Ka'ohulani Aiu, a Kumu Hula of her mother's first graduating class in Hula Kahiko (ancient hula) - 'Uniki Papa Lehua, and  Coline Kaualoku Aiu, a former Miss Hawai'i, are also extremely skilled at the "Art of Hawaiian Dance". Coline teaches in Honolulu as Kumu Hula for Halau Hula 'O Ma'iki and Karen, Kumu Hula of Halau Hawai'i, continues Ma'iki's legacy by teaching and performing her hula troupe in Waikiki, as well as in several cities in Japan.

Famous Quotes and Philosophies by Ma'iki Aiu Lake 

“Hula is Life”

"Hula is the Art of Hawaiian Dance, expressing all that we see, smell, hear, taste, touch and feel."

"People who don't know how to dance, but who have a loving spirit, can be cultivated to be dancers.”

"Take what I have given you and make it better."

"Remember, you learn, but it is not yours to give until your teacher allows you that right."  

"Tomorrow is a new day - Next!"

"Even if you were not born in Hawai'i or do not have Hawaiian blood - if you love the beautiful blue sky and cooling trade winds, smell the fragrant flowers of the islands, put your feet in the sand near the shore and feel the warmth of the surf, see in awe the majestic and green uplands of the verdant valleys and mountains ... If you love these things about Hawai'i - then YOU ARE HAWAIIAN."

References

1925 births
1984 deaths
Hula dancers